Vyacheslav Fursov (born 19 July 1954) is a Soviet racewalker. He competed in the men's 50 kilometres walk at the 1980 Summer Olympics.

References

1954 births
Living people
Athletes (track and field) at the 1980 Summer Olympics
Soviet male racewalkers
Olympic athletes of the Soviet Union
Place of birth missing (living people)